Kenny Burrell is an album by American jazz guitarist Kenny Burrell recorded in 1956 and released on the Blue Note label. The cover art was commissioned from Andy Warhol. In 2000, it was released on the 2 CD-set Introducing Kenny Burrell: The First Blue Note Sessions along with Introducing Kenny Burrell, plus bonus tracks.

Track listing
 "Get Happy" (Harold Arlen, Ted Koehler) - 4:02 
 "But Not for Me" (George Gershwin, Ira Gershwin) - 3:49
 "Mexico City" (Kenny Dorham) - 6:03
 "Moten Swing" (Bennie Moten) - 6:08 
 "Cheetah" (Kenny Burrell) - 4:43
 "Now See How You Are" (Woody Harris, Oscar Pettiford) - 5:54 
 "Phinupi" - 4:42 
 "How About You?" (Burton Lane, Ralph Freed) - 5:14

 Recorded on March 12 (tracks 4-8) at the Audio-Video Studios, NYC, May 29 (track 1) & May 30 (track 2) at the Van Gelder Studio, Hackensack, NJ , May 31 1956 (track 3) at the Cafe Bohemia. Track 3 is an alternate take to the version on Dorham's 'Round About Midnight at the Cafe Bohemia.

Personnel
Kenny Burrell - guitar
Kenny Dorham (track 3) - trumpet 
Frank Foster  (tracks 6-8), J. R. Monterose (track 3) - tenor saxophone
Tommy Flanagan (except 2) - piano 
Paul Chambers (track 1), Sam Jones (track 3), Oscar Pettiford (tracks 4-8) - bass
Kenny Clarke (track 1), Arthur Edgehill (track 3), Shadow Wilson (tracks 4-8) - drums
Candido (track 1) - conga

References

Blue Note Records albums
Kenny Burrell albums
1957 albums
Albums recorded at Van Gelder Studio
Albums with cover art by Andy Warhol